The canton of Millau-2 is an administrative division of the Aveyron department, southern France. It was created at the French canton reorganisation which came into effect in March 2015. Its seat is in Millau.

It consists of the following communes:
Aguessac
Compeyre
Millau (partly)
Nant
Paulhe
Saint-Jean-du-Bruel

References

Cantons of Aveyron